Speaker of the Legislative Assembly of Samoa is the presiding officer of Legislative Assembly of Samoa, elected by all members of the assembly for a term of 5 years.

Presidents of the Legislative Assembly
From 1948 to 1957 the High Commissioner served as President of the Legislative Assembly.

Speakers of the Legislative Assembly

References

Legislative Assembly, Speakers
Samoa